The Whitney family is an American family founded by John Whitney (1592–1673) who immigrated from London, England to Watertown, Massachusetts in 1635. The historic family mansion in Watertown, known as The Elms, was built for the Whitneys in 1710. Today, the Whitneys occupy a distinguished position in American society as a result of their entrepreneurship, wealth, and philanthropy. They are also members of the Episcopal Church.

Throughout the United States' existence, successive generations of the Whitney family have had a significant impact on its history. Eli Whitney's invention of the cotton gin in 1793 enabled slaves to pick cotton 50 times faster, a breakthrough which led the country to become home to 75% of the world's cotton supply.  This caused the demand for slaves to increase rapidly, “Slaves were a profitable investment before the cotton gin and an even more profitable investment after its invention” law professor Paul Finkleman argued in the Yale Journal of Law and the Humanities.  Beginning in 1844, Asa Whitney launched a campaign for a railway linking the American West to the East Coast that ultimately resulted in the first American transcontinental railroad. Upon taking office as U.S. Secretary of the Navy in 1885, William Collins Whitney oversaw the fleet's widespread adoption of steel ships. During the 20th century, family members continued to exercise massive influence over the U.S. economy through nationwide conglomerates such as Pan Am, J.H. Whitney & Company and Freeport-McMoran. 

Beginning with William Collins Whitney, members of the Whitney family would become major figures for more than a century in the breeding and racing of Thoroughbred horses.

Prominent descendants of John Whitney

Amos Whitney (1832–1920)
Anne Whitney (1821–1915)
Antony Whitney
Asa Whitney (1797–1872)
Asa Whitney (canal commissioner) (1791–1874)
Benson Whitney (born 1956)
Charlotte Anita Whitney (1867–1955)
Charles Andrew Whitney (1834–1912)
Cornelius Vanderbilt Whitney (1899–1992)
Courtney Whitney (1897–1969)
David Whitney Jr. (1830-1900)
Dorothy Payne Whitney (1887–1968)
Edward Baldwin Whitney (1857–1911)
Eli Whitney (1765–1825)
 Eli Whitney Blake (1795–1886), inventor
 Eli Whitney Blake, Jr. (1836–1895), scientist
 Eli Whitney Debevoise II (born 1953)
Flora Payne Whitney (1897–1986)
Whitney Tower (1923–1999)
Flora Miller Biddle (born 1928)
Harry Payne Whitney (1872–1930)
Hassler Whitney (1907–1989)
Henry Melville Whitney (1839–1923)
James Scollay Whitney (1811–1878)
Joan Whitney Payson (1903–1975)
John Hay Whitney (1905–1982)
Josephine Whitney Duveneck (1891–1978)
Josiah Dwight Whitney (1819–1896)
Mary Watson Whitney (1847–1921)
Newel Kimball Whitney (1795–1850)
Orson F. Whitney (1855–1931)
Parkhurst Whitney (1784–1862)
Pauline Payne Whitney (1874–1916)
Olive, Lady Baillie Olive Cecilia Paget, (1899–1974), Anglo-American heiress, landowner and hostess.
Dorothy Wyndham Paget (1905–1960), British racehorse owner and sponsor of motor racing
William Payne Whitney (1876–1927)
Phyllis Ayame Whitney (1903–2008)
Richard Whitney (1888–1974)
Wheelock Whitney I (1894–1957)
Wheelock Whitney, Jr. (1926–2016)
Wheelock Whitney III (born 1949)
William Collins Whitney (1841–1904)
William Dwight Whitney (1827–1894)
Willis Rodney Whitney (1868–1958)

By marriage: 

Mary Elizabeth Altemus (1906–1988)
Charles T. Barney (1851–1907)
Kathleen Blatz (born 1954)
Betsey Cushing (1908–1998)
Henry F. Dimock (1842–1911)
Leonard Knight Elmhirst (1893–1974)
Helen Julia Hay (1876–1944)
Almeric Hugh Paget, 1st Baron Queenborough (1861–1949), British industrialist and politician
Marie Louise Schroeder (1925–2019)
Willard Dickerman Straight (1880–1918)
Whitney Willard Straight (1912–1979)
Beatrice Whitney Straight (1914–2001)
Michael Whitney Straight (1916–2004)
Adeline Dutton Train (1824–1906)
Gertrude Vanderbilt  (1875–1942)
George W. Headley (1908–1985)
Dorothy Laverne Whitney(1930-currently)
Alfa Vanderbilt-Winther(1924-2008)

Family Network

Associates

Henry Lawrence Burnett
Roscoe Channing
Merian C. Cooper
Herbert Croly
William Lukens Elkins
Catharine Littlefield Greene
Daniel Guggenheim
Daniel S. Lamont
Oliver Hazard Payne
Benjamin Franklin Pearson
Francis A. Pratt
Benno C. Schmidt Sr.
David O. Selznick
Kenneth A. Spencer
Charles Shipman Payson
Sherman Pratt
Thomas Fortune Ryan
W.E.D. Stokes
Ilya Andreyevich Tolstoy
Juan Trippe
Clarissa Watson
Peter A.B. Widener
Langbourne Meade Williams Jr.
Richard Thornton Wilson Jr.

Businesses

American Tobacco Company
Art in America
Burnett & Whitney
Cataract House Hotel
C.V. Whitney Farm
Dominion Iron & Steel Company
Dun & Bradstreet
Foshalee Plantation
Freeport Texas Company
Great Northern Paper
Greentree Stable
Guggenheim Exploration Company
Hudson Bay Mining & Smelting Company
International Herald Tribune
J.H. Whitney & Company
Manhasset Stable
Marineland of Florida
Metropolitan Steamship Company
Metropolitan Street Railway Company
Minnesota North Stars
Minnesota Vikings
Minute Maid Company
The New Republic
New York Loan & Improvement Company
New York Mets
Pan Am
Pratt & Whitney Measurement Systems
Selznick International Pictures
Spencer Chemical Company
Standard Oil
Technicolor Corporation
West End Street Railway
Westbury Stable
Western Airways
Whitney Armory
Whitney Real Estate Corporation

Philanthropy & non-profit organizations

Almeric Paget Massage Corps
American Philological Association
Association of Junior Leagues International
Country Art Gallery & Art School
Dartington College of Arts
Dartington International Summer School
Greentree Foundation
Helen Hay Whitney Foundation
Jockey Club (United States)
John Hay Whitney Foundation
Markey Cancer Center
National Museum of Dance and Hall of Fame
National Museum of Racing and Hall of Fame
The New School for Social Research
North Shore University Hospital
Payne Whitney Gymnasium
Payne Whitney Psychiatric Clinic
Saratoga Performing Arts Center
Whitney Laboratory for Marine Bioscience
Whitney South Sea Expedition
William C. Whitney Foundation
Whitney Gallery of Western Art
Whitney Museum of American Art
Whitney Stakes (NYRA)

Buildings, estates & historic sites

Belmont Park
Breuer Building
Brookdale Farm
Cady Hill 
Dartington Hall
David Whitney House
Eli Whitney Gun Factory
The Elms 
Greentree
Greenwood Plantation
Joye Cottage
Llangollen Farm
Payne Whitney House
Saratoga Race Course
Waters Farm
Whitney Studio Gallery
Whitney Park
Willard Straight Hall

References

Bibliography

External links 
 Whitney Research Group – dedicated to the scholarly research of Whitney families around the world and throughout history.
 July 25, 2008 Bloodhorse.com article titled "The Whitney Handicap: a look at a treasured American family"

 
American families of English ancestry
Business families of the United States
Episcopalian families
Political families of the United States